"Kyrila" is a song by Greek singer Demis Roussos. It was released as a single (in Germany) and as an EP (in the UK) in 1977.

The German version of the song was included on Roussos's 1977 German-language album Kyrila – Insel der Träume.

Background and writing 
The German version of the song was written by Piet Souer, Ekambi Brillant, and Wolfgang Mürmann. The recording was arranged and produced by Leo Leandros.

The English version of the song was written by Piet Souer, Ekambi Brillant, and Robert Constandinos. Its recording was also produced by Leo Leandros.

Commercial performance 
In Germany the song was released as a single. It reached no. 40 on the German chart

The German version was released on an EP titled "Kyrila". It reached no. 33 in the UK Singles Chart.

Track listing 
7-inch single Philips 6042 283 (13 December 1976)
 A. "Kyrila" (3:36)
 B. "Leierkasten auf dem Boulevard" (2:58)

7-inch EP Philips DEMIS 002 (1977, UK)
 1. "Kyrila" (3:36) [English]
 2. "I'm Gonna Fall in Love" (3:13)
 3. "I Dig You" (4:06)
 4. "Sister Emilyne" (2:57)

Charts

References

External links 
 Demis Roussos — "Kyrila" (German single, vinyl) at Discogs
 Demis Roussos — "Kyrila" (UK EP, vinyl) at Discogs

1977 songs
1977 singles
Demis Roussos songs
Philips Records singles
Song recordings produced by Leo Leandros
Songs written by Piet Souer